B2W Software (formerly known as Bid2Win Software) is a privately held company based in Portsmouth, New Hampshire that develops specialized estimation and bid management software for heavy construction contractors to manage construction estimating and bidding, field tracking and analysis, equipment maintenance, resource scheduling and dispatching and eForms and reporting.

Founded in 1993 under the name Niche Software, the company was first started with an estimating and bidding software program for the construction industry. It rebranded once more in January 2013, going from Bid2Win Software to B2W Software.

The B2W Software ONE Platform includes individual modules, or elements -  B2W Estimate (estimating & bidding), B2W Track (field tracking & analysis), released in January 2008, B2W Schedule (resource scheduling & dispatching), released in 2018, B2W Maintain (equipment maintenance & repair management), which was released in 2013, and B2W Inform (eForms and reporting).

On September 14, 2022, B2W was acquired by Trimble Inc.

References

1993 establishments in New Hampshire
Companies based in Portsmouth, New Hampshire
Software companies established in 1993
Software companies based in New Hampshire
Defunct software companies of the United States
2022 mergers and acquisitions